The 1956 United States presidential election in Tennessee took place on November 6, 1956, as part of the 1956 United States presidential election. Tennessee voters chose 11 representatives, or electors, to the Electoral College, who voted for president and vice president.

Tennessee was won by incumbent President Dwight D. Eisenhower (R–Pennsylvania), running with Vice President Richard Nixon, with 49.21% of the popular vote, against Adlai Stevenson (D–Illinois), running with Senator Estes Kefauver, with 48.60% of the popular vote.

Results

Results by county

Notes

References

Tennessee
1956
1956 Tennessee elections